The Hedgehog and the Fox may refer to:
 "The Hedgehog and the Fox" (essay), 1953 work by Isaiah Berlin
 "The Hedgehog and the Fox" (fable), alternative version of "The Fox and the Cat", one of Aesop's fables
 The Hedgehog and the Fox (sculpture), 1999 work by Richard Serra

See also
 The Hedgehog, the Fox, and the Magister's Pox, 2003 book by Stephen Jay Gould